Tornade was a  (torpilleur d'escadre) built for the French Navy during the 1920s.

After France surrendered to Germany in June 1940 during World War II, Tornade served with the navy of Vichy France. She was at Oran, French Algeria, when the Allies invaded French North Africa in Operation Torch in November 1942. Resisting the invasion, she was badly damaged off Oran on 8 November 1942 by gunfire by the Royal Navy light cruiser  and destroyer  and was beached to avoid sinking.

Design and description
They were powered by two geared steam turbines, each driving one propeller shaft, using steam provided by three du Temple boilers.

The main armament of the Bourrasque-class ships consisted of four Canon de  Modèle 1919 guns in shielded single mounts, one superfiring pair each fore and aft of the superstructure. Their anti-aircraft (AA) armament consisted of a single Canon de  Modèle 1924 gun. The ships carried two triple mounts of  torpedo tubes amidships. A pair of depth charge chutes were built into their stern that housed a total of sixteen  depth charges.

Notes

References

 
 

Bourrasque-class destroyers
World War II destroyers of France
Ships built by Dyle et Bacalan
1925 ships
Maritime incidents in November 1942